Horace Edwin Bullen (13 March 1906 – 7 November 1961) was an Australian rules footballer who played with Hawthorn and Carlton in the Victorian Football League (VFL).

Bullen, a ruckman and key defender, came to Hawthorn from Doncaster, to make two appearances in the 1926 VFL season. He continued playing at Doncaster until 1932, when he joined Carlton. In the 1932 VFL Grand Final, which Carlton lost, Bullen kicked two goals.

References

1906 births
Australian rules footballers from Melbourne
Hawthorn Football Club players
Carlton Football Club players
1961 deaths
People from Doncaster, Victoria